Tina Chow (born Bettina Louise Lutz, April 18, 1950 – January 24, 1992) was an American model and jewelry designer who was considered an influential fashion icon of the 1970s and 1980s. She was the second wife of restaurateur Michael Chow, the founder and owner of the Mr. Chow restaurant chain.

Early life
Chow was born Bettina Louise Lutz in Lakewood, Ohio. Her mother, Mona Furuki, was Japanese, while her father, Walter Edmund Lutz (1910–2003), was an American of German descent. Walter Lutz met Mona Furuki on Christmas Day 1945, while serving with the United States Army in occupied Japan. Chow's sister is artist, designer and actress Adelle Lutz.

Career

Modeling
In the mid-1960s, the family moved from Ohio to Japan, where Chow attended Sophia University. Both sisters were later discovered by a modeling agent and became the faces of Japanese cosmetic line Shiseido and featured prominently in their ad campaigns from the early 1970s. During her modeling career she was photographed by Helmut Newton, Cecil Beaton and Arthur Elgort, among others. She was drawn by illustrator Antonio Lopez and painted by Andy Warhol. She was also the muse of designers Yves St. Laurent and Issey Miyake.

Chow was cited by fashion magazines for her unique style and her collection of Mariano Fortuny dresses. She routinely paired inexpensive items with high fashion pieces and mixed feminine and masculine styles simultaneously. Chow was also noted for her androgynous Eton crop hairstyle which she had cut at a New York barbershop and styled with Dippity Do.  In 1985, she was named on the International Best Dressed List.

Jewelry designing
During the late 1980s, Tina Chow designed and produced several collections of jewelry. Using rock crystal, gold, silver, wood, bamboo, and silk cording. In 1987, the first collection was sold at Bergdorf Goodman in New York, Maxfield's in Los Angeles, at Ultimo in Chicago, and later (from 1988) at Gallerie Naila Monbrison in Paris. Perhaps one of the best known pieces in the collection is the "Kyoto Bracelet," which is a woven bamboo bangle which encases seven rough rock crystals or rose quartz in their natural form. The crystals, left loose inside the bamboo casing, rattle around as the wearer moves about. For the bamboo wrapping and basketry work in the collection Chow enlisted Kosuge Shochikudo, one of Japan's master craftsmen in the art of bamboo. In April 1988, designer Calvin Klein accessorized the showing of his Fall/Winter 1988/89 collection with Chow's jewelry.

Personal life
In 1972, Tina married Michael Chow, who owns the Mr. Chow restaurant chain. The Chows had two children, a daughter China (born 1974) and a son Maximillian (born 1978). China is a model and an actress. The couple divorced in November 1989. Chow was Talking Heads frontman David Byrne's sister-in-law, through his 1987-2004 marriage to Adelle Lutz.

Later years and death
After her marriage to Michael Chow ended, Tina Chow began to drift away from the party lifestyle for which the couple had become known. She  became an AIDS activist after having lost many friends to the disease.

In June 1989, Chow was diagnosed with AIDS. She had contracted HIV in late 1985 after having an affair with French aristocrat Kim d'Estainville who died of AIDS in January 1990.  She made her diagnosis public in an effort to educate others and continued working as an AIDS activist and with AIDS charities, including Project Angel Food. Chow continued designing jewelry.

Chow moved to California, where she chose to treat her illness with meditation and a macrobiotic diet. On January 24, 1992, she died of complications from AIDS at her home in Pacific Palisades at the age of 41.

References

External links
 Tina Chow Style Article
 The Influential Legacy of Tina Chow

1950 births
1992 deaths
AIDS-related deaths in California
Female models from Ohio
American jewelry designers
American people of German descent
American models of Japanese descent
HIV/AIDS activists
People from Logan County, Ohio
20th-century American women
Women jewellers